Archibald of Douglas (before 1198 – died c. 1238) was a Scottish nobleman. He was the son of William of Douglas.

Life
The earliest attestation of his existence is in a charter of confirmation dated prior to 1198. This charter of Jocelin, Bishop of Glasgow, granted the rights of a toft in Glasgow to Melrose Abbey. Archibald's name appears between that of Alan, High Steward of Scotland and Robert de Montgomery. Also before 1198, Archibald appears in another document, again before 1198, in which he resigns the lands of Hailes held by him of the Abbey of Dunfermline, to Robert of Restalrig. Between 1214 and 1226, Archibald acquired the use of the lands of Hermiston and Livingston, with Maol Choluim I, Earl of Fife as his feudal superior. Archibald of Douglas must have been knighted before 1226 as he appears in another charter of Melrose Abbey as 'Dominus de Douglas' witnessing William Purves of Mospennoc granting the Monks of Melrose rights to pass through his lands. Another witness is Andrew, Archibald's knight which highlights his influential position. Archibald de Douglas appears as a signatory to several royal charters following 1226, and he appears to have spent a considerable time in Moray as episcopal charters of his brother Bricius de Douglas show.
He was in the retinue of the King Alexander II, at Selkirk, in 1238 when the title Earl of Lennox was regranted to Maol Domhnaich of Lennox. Douglas disappears from historical record after 1239 and it is presumed that he died about this time.

Marriage and issue
Archibald of Douglas is thought to have married Margaret, daughter of Sir John Crawford of Crawfordjohn and had issue:

William of Douglas (c.1220–c.1274)
Andrew Douglas of Hermiston, progenitor of the Lords of Dalkeith & Earls of Morton and Lords of Mains.

References

Notes

Sources
Registrum Honoris de Morton, ed. Thomson, MacDonald, Innes. Bannatyne Club, Edinburgh 1853.
Liber Sancte Marie de Melros: munimenta vetustiora Monasterii Cisterciensis de Melros, ed. Innes. Bannatyne Club, Edinburgh 1837. 
Maxwell, Sir Herbert. A History of the House of Douglas. London 1902
Balfour Paul, Sir James. The Scots Peerage IX Vols. Edinburgh 1907
Fraser, Sir William. The Douglas Book IV Vols. Edinburgh 1885

1190s births
1230s deaths
Scoto-Normans
Archibald 01, Lord of Douglas
Scottish knights
Year of birth uncertain
Year of death uncertain